Livonia is an unincorporated community in the Appalachian Mountains of central Pennsylvania, United States. Livonia is in Miles Township, Centre County, near the head of Brush Valley, just west of Hough Mountain and just north of Elk Creek. It is located on Railroad Creek at the intersection of Pennsylvania Routes PA 477 and PA 192. Elevation is 1,499 feet. The nearest post office is in Loganton, Pennsylvania, but mail in handled out of Rebersburg.

Nearby is Bald Eagle State Forest and White Deer Creek is known for its fly-fishing.

History
 
Livonia was first settled in the 1840s, but the economy did not flourish until the railroad spur reached them about 1900 during a logging boom. There was a Civilian Conservation Corps camp there from 1933 to 1942.

Notes and references

Unincorporated communities in Centre County, Pennsylvania
Populated places established in the 1840s
1840s establishments in Pennsylvania
Unincorporated communities in Pennsylvania